Catskill Game Farm Inc. was a family owned petting zoo in the town of Catskill, New York, United States, which operated from 1933 to 2006. The Game Farm closed permanently on Columbus Day October 9, 2006, after seventy-three years of operation.

The property was purchased by new owners in 2012 and the former giraffe barn has been developed into a hotel and opened in October 2019 following an extensive renovation of the existing building.

History: The Catskill Game Farm (1933-2006)
The Catskill Game Farm was opened in 1933 by Roland Lindemann and it was sold to his daughter Kathie Schulz in 1989. In August 2006, the Catskill Game Farm announced that it would be closing on October 9th that year, ending over 70 years of operation citing declining business. Business peaked in the 1960s. An auction was held in October 2006 to sell off equipment and animals. The auction was held over two days and it attracted over 1,000 potential bidders from US, Canada and Mexico.  

At first, it held only deer, donkeys, and sheep. In 1958, the United States Department of Agriculture recognized Catskill Game Farm as a zoo, and it became the first privately owned venture to achieve such status. The collection was then allowed to grow more exotic, and at the time of its closing, it hosted roughly 2,000 animals representing over 150 species, imported from around the world.

April The Giraffe (Born 2002)
A giraffe named April was born in 2002 at the Catskill Game Farm.

Upon the closing of the Catskill Game Farm in October 2006, April was first sold to Adirondack Animal Land, in Vail Mills, New York; and then to Animal Adventure Park, in Harpursville, New York, in 2015, where she resided until her death on April 2, 2021. 

April became known internationally when a live video of the late stages of her pregnancy, along with her birth, were published on the Internet in 2002.

Redevelopment 
Ben and Cathy Ballone purchased the former Catskill Game Farm property in 2012. They established The Old Game Farm. They have been working to reopen the site as a family-oriented establishment once again, with the addition of a B&B, campground, and RV resort with animals. The new owners have developed the former giraffe barn into a hotel. It was the home of several generations and families of giraffes, including April which was born there in 2002. The Inn opened on Tuesday, October 1, 2019, following an extensive renovation of the existing building. The inn features five guest rooms and four campsites. An exhibit of memorabilia highlighting the history of the former Catskill Game Farm is displayed at the inn.

References

External links
 Official Catskill Game Farm website (archived on October 4, 2006, five days before its closing, after seventy-three years of operation)
 The Old Game Farm (Established 2012. Current owner's website)
 Catskill Game Farm Set To Open Long Neck Inn (February 7, 2019. )

Further reading
 (Catskill Game Farm Photo Tour)
 
 

Zoos in New York (state)
Catskills
Former zoos
Zoos established in 1933
Zoos disestablished in 2006
1933 establishments in New York (state)
2006 disestablishments in New York (state)